The scaled sculpins, Icelus, are a genus of marine ray-finned fishes belonging to the family Cottidae, the typical sculpins. Most of the fishes in this genus are found in the northern Pacific Ocean but they also occur in the North Atlantic Ocean.

Taxonomy
The scaled sculpin genus, Icelus was first proposed as a monospecific genus in 1845 by the Danish zoologist Henrik Nikolai Krøyer when he described Icelus hamatus as a new species from Belsund in Spitsbergen. L. hamatus has since been determined to be  synonym of Cottus bicornis, which had been described by Johan Reinhardt in 1840 from East Greenland. The 5th edition of Fishes of the World classifies the genus Artediellus within the subfamily Cottinae of the family Cottidae, however, other authors classify the genus within the subfamily Icelinae of the family Psychrolutidae. Previously this genus was classified as the only genus in the family Icelidae which was proposed in 1923 by David Starr Jordan.

Etymology
The scaled sculpin genus name, Icelus, is the name of one of the sons of Hypnus, a Greek god of sleep and is a reference to the sluggish movements of many northern sculpin species.

Species 
The 17 recognised species in this genus are:
 Icelus armatus (P. J. Schmidt, 1916)
 Icelus bicornis (J. C. H. Reinhardt, 1840) (twohorn sculpin)
 Icelus canaliculatus C. H. Gilbert, 1896 (blacknose sculpin)
 Icelus cataphractus (Pavlenko, 1910)
 Icelus ecornis Tsutsui & Yabe, 1996
 Icelus euryops Bean, 1890
 Icelus gilberti Taranetz, 1936
 Icelus hypselopterus Fukuzawa, Mori, Matsuzaki & Kai, 2022
 Icelus mandibularis Yabe, 1983
 Icelus ochotensis P. J. Schmidt, 1927
 Icelus perminovi Taranetz, 1936 (scaly-belly sculpin)
 Icelus rastrinoides Taranetz, 1936
 Icelus sekii Tsuruoka, Munehara & Yabe, 2006
 Icelus spatula C. H. Gilbert & Burke, 1912 (spatulate sculpin)
 Icelus spiniger C. H. Gilbert, 1896 (thorny sculpin)
 Icelus stenosomus Andriashev, 1937
 Icelus toyamensis (Matsubara & Iwai, 1951)
 Icelus uncinalis C. H. Gilbert & Burke, 1912

Characteristics
Scaled sculpins are characterised by having a single row of large, spiny plate-like scales underneath the dorsal fins, having spinous tube-like scales on the lateral line, they have scales on the axil of the pectoral fins as well as on the upper part of the eye. They also have a spine or bump on the nuchal bone.

Distribution
Scaled sculpins are mainly Pacific species, 16 of the 18 species being found in the North Pacific Ocean, with 2 species, the twohorn sculpin (I. bicornis) and the spatulate sculpin (I. spatula) being found in the Atlantic Ocean, the latter also being found in teh Arctic Ocean.

References

Cottinae
 
Taxa named by Henrik Nikolai Krøyer